, better known as , is a Japanese popular singer of chansons.

Discography
Albums
POKKOWA PA? (Pokkowa Pas 1987 Sound World)
MACHI (1994 Eastern Gail)
End of the century of the Waltz (1996 Toshiba EMI)
AURA (2000 songs lyricist Takashi Matsumoto Toshiba EMI)
Love Hymn (2002 avex io)
When there is only love (2003 avex io)
Icarus star - sing a Fubuki Koshiji (2004 avex io)
I Aozora - 2004 Cocoon Live (2005 CD and DVD avex io)
Kumiko Best - Our Uruwashiki love story (2006 avex io)
Song Tachi of ten years and 1970s (2007 avex io)
Complete Kumiko box - twenty-five years ~ (2007 CD8 sheets + DVD avex io)
Kumiko meets Piaf (2007 avex io)
My friend! ~ That starting Chi - Let's call the (journey) to "youth" (2008 avex io)
Kumiko & Yoshio Inoue reach did not Ravureta Song Book (2010 avex io)
Kumiko New Best "INORI~ prayer ~" (2011 avex io)
ALONG THE Songs - has been walking with this song ~ (2012 avex io)
Kumiko Chanson Best (2013 avex io)
Beautiful era of song - Kumiko Columbia Covers (2014 Nippon Columbia)

References

1954 births
Living people